Jill Perryman AM, MBE (born 30 May 1933) is an Australian former stage and screen actress and singer. Combining both her stage acting and her singing, she featured in numerous musical theatre roles, over eight decades and spanning 70 years of performing, starting from the age of 3 in a local production of the Austrian operetta White Horse Inn.
 
She toured twice with a production of Hello Dolly! firstly in 1965, as an understudy to American star Carole Cook, as a member of the ensemble cast as character Irene Molley and again almost thirty years later in 1994 in the leading role. 

Perryman, is exceptional in local theatre, when many productions featured internationally imported stars, even whom had not commonly performed the leading roles on  Broadway and the West End. Alongside her contemporaries Toni Lamond and Nancye Hayes, has been called one of the three local Grand Dame's of Musical Theatre.
 

Perryman although a staple of theatre, has appeared in numerous guest roles in television series and briefly in film making her debut in Maybe This Time in 1980.

Personal life

Perryman was born in Melbourne, Victoria to a family notable for its achievements in theatre and entertainment. Her father, William Thomas Perryman, was an actor and performer, with notable credits from 1919 until 1938 and her mother Dorothy Eileen (formerly Duvall), born in Adelaide was an actress and singer, who appeared in a few productions from 1923 until 1932.  
 
Her older sister, Diana Perryman (1925–1979), was prominent in Australian theatre and also appeared in television roles. Her husband is Western Australian dancer-choreographer Kevan Johnston, and they have a son Tod Johnston, who is a media personality, radio and television presenter, and musician. Diana Perryman was posthumously awarded an MBE.

Her daughter Trudy Dunn is also a performer

Career 

Perryman in 1952, then aged 19, joined the company of J. C. Williamson Theatres Ltd as a member of the chorus and in the following year was understudying leading roles in stage musicals, under Evie Hayes in a local production of Call Me Madam.  
 
Perryman was strong in voice and personality, and a long series of understudy and small roles eventually led her, through the recommendation of John McCallum (who was then joint managing director of J. C. Williamson Theatres Ltd), to take the lead in the key Australian production of Funny Girl, a performance that won her an Erik Award for Best Actress and led to major roles in other productions.

These included I Do! I Do! in 1969; The Two of Us in 1971. No, No, Nanette in 1972 won her another Erik Award for Best Actress for her role as Lucille Early, then in 1973 she starred in A Little Night Music. In 1976 she played Gladys Zilch in Leading Lady, a musical production created especially for her. She also toured during 1977 in Side by Side by Sondheim. She played Miss Hannigan in Annie in 1978.

Perryman won the A.F.I. (Australian Film Institute) Award for Best Actress in a Supporting Role in 1980.
 
She toured in the musicals Chicago in 1988 and The Boy From Oz in 1998

Stage roles 
source= AusStage

Filmography 

FILM

TELEVISION

Selected appearances

Honours and awards

References

External links
 Jill Perryman Collection, in the Performing Arts Collection and Arts Centre Melbourne.

1933 births
Actresses from Melbourne
Australian stage actresses
Australian women singers
Helpmann Award winners
Living people
Members of the Order of Australia
Australian Members of the Order of the British Empire
Musicians from Perth, Western Australia
Singers from Melbourne
Best Supporting Actress AACTA Award winners